Weilo is a village on the south-eastern coast of New Ireland, Papua New Guinea. The Weilo River flows nearby. It is located in Konoagil Rural LLG.

References

Populated places in New Ireland Province